The small western froglet (Crinia subinsignifera) is a species of frog in the family Myobatrachidae.
It is endemic to Australia.
Its natural habitats are temperate forests, subtropical or tropical seasonally wet or flooded lowland grassland, swamps, freshwater lakes, intermittent freshwater lakes, freshwater marshes, and intermittent freshwater marshes.
It is threatened by habitat loss.

References

Crinia
Amphibians of Western Australia
Amphibians described in 1957
Taxonomy articles created by Polbot
Frogs of Australia